Marjory Wentworth may refer to:

Marjory Heath Wentworth, American poet
Margery Wentworth, mother of Queen Jane Seymour, the third wife of King Henry VIII of England